Emiliano Ariel Rigoni (born 4 February 1993) is an Argentine professional footballer who plays as a right winger for Major League Soccer club Austin FC.

Club career

Rigoni is a youth exponent from Club Atlético Belgrano. He made his league debut on 4 August 2013 against CA Lanús in a 3–0 away defeat. In January 2016, he joined Club Atlético Independiente. He has scored in his debut for Independiente against his former club Belgrano.

On 23 August 2017, Rigoni moved to Russia, signing a four-year contract with FC Zenit Saint Petersburg.

On 19 October 2017, he scored the first hat-trick of his career in a 3–1 Europa League group win over Rosenborg BK.

On 17 August 2018, Zenit announced that Rigoni would join Serie A club Atalanta B.C. for the 2018–19 season, with Atalanta holding an option to make the transfer permanent at the end of the loan. On 14 January 2019, Rigoni returned to Zenit.

On 2 September 2019, Zenit announced that Rigoni would spend the rest of the 2019–20 on loan to Italian club U.C. Sampdoria, with Sampdoria holding an option to purchase his rights at the end of the loan. On 1 February 2020, Sampdoria terminated the loan early.

On 1 July 2020, he scored a late winner in Zenit's 2–1 away victory against FC Tambov. On 5 October, deadline day, he moved to La Liga side Elche via one-year loan.

On 21 May 2021, Rigoni signed a three-year contract with Brazilian club São Paulo FC.

On 29 July 2022, Rigoni joined Major League Soccer club Austin FC on a deal until the end of the 2024 season.

International career
Rigoni made his debut for the Argentina national football team on 5 October 2017 in a 2018 World Cup qualifier against Peru.

Personal life
Rigoni is of Italian descent and holds an Italian passport, which counts him as an EU player for European competitions.

Career statistics

Club

International

Honours
Zenit Saint Petersburg
Russian Premier League: 2018–19, 2019–20, 2020–21
 Russian Cup: 2019–20
 Russian Super Cup: 2020

References

1993 births
Sportspeople from Córdoba Province, Argentina
Living people
Association football midfielders
Argentine footballers
Argentina international footballers
Argentine people of Italian descent
Argentine expatriate footballers
Argentine Primera División players
Club Atlético Belgrano footballers
Club Atlético Independiente footballers
FC Zenit Saint Petersburg players
São Paulo FC players
Campeonato Brasileiro Série A players
Russian Premier League players
Serie A players
Atalanta B.C. players
U.C. Sampdoria players
La Liga players
Elche CF players
Austin FC players
Designated Players (MLS)
Argentine expatriate sportspeople in Russia
Argentine expatriate sportspeople in Italy
Argentine expatriate sportspeople in Spain
Argentine expatriate sportspeople in Brazil
Argentine expatriate sportspeople in the United States
Expatriate footballers in Russia
Expatriate footballers in Italy
Expatriate footballers in Spain
Expatriate footballers in Brazil
Expatriate soccer players in the United States
Major League Soccer players